van Emmerik is a surname. Notable people with the surname include:

Ivo van Emmerik (born 1961), Dutch composer
Raymon van Emmerik (born 1980), Dutch footballer
 

Surnames of Dutch origin